The Rainier Brewing Company Bottling Plant, at 310 Spokane St. in Reno, Nevada, was built in 1905.  It was also known as Ice House Antiques and required $30,000 to build.

History 
In 1914 with the start of Prohibition in Washington State, the brewing moved to San Francisco. Beer did continue to be bottled at the plant until 1919, when the 18th amendment and the Volstead Act forced them to stop. Rainier Brewing Company had to diversify and in 1919, Nevada Supply Company started to sell non-alcoholic beverages from the location. They housed other businesses including the Nevada National Ice and Cold Storage Company, National Coal Co., National Ice Co., National Oil and Burner Co. and the Ice House Antiques.

It was listed on the National Register of Historic Places in 1980.

It was deemed important as a vestige of the once-significant brewing industry in Reno.

Today, the building houses the Spice House Adult Caberet.

References

External links

Industrial buildings completed in 1905
National Register of Historic Places in Reno, Nevada
Buildings and structures in Reno, Nevada
Industrial buildings and structures on the National Register of Historic Places in Nevada
Beer brewing companies based in Nevada
1905 establishments in Nevada